The 2009 WGC-Accenture Match Play Championship was a golf tournament that was played from February 25 to March 1, 2009, at the Ritz-Carlton Golf Club at Dove Mountain in Marana, Arizona. It was the eleventh WGC-Accenture Match Play Championship and the first of four World Golf Championships held in 2009.

The tournament marked the return of Tiger Woods to the PGA Tour, following eight months out of the sport after undergoing knee surgery shortly after his victory in the 2008 U.S. Open.

Geoff Ogilvy continued his success at the WGC-Accenture Match Play Championship defeating Paul Casey, who had not trailed in any of his first five matches, 4 and 3 in the final. It was Ogilvy's second win in the event, in which reached the final for the third time in four years. The victory also improved his already impressive match record in the event to 17 wins and 2 losses.

Brackets
The Championship was a single elimination match play event. The field consisted of the top 64 players available from the Official World Golf Rankings as of the February 16 ranking, seeded according to the rankings. All of the top 64 players in the February 16 ranking participated in the event, the first time in the tournament's history that had happened.

Bobby Jones bracket

Ben Hogan bracket

Gary Player bracket

Sam Snead bracket

Final Four

Breakdown by country

Prize money breakdown

 Source:

Notes and references

External links
Official site

WGC Match Play
Golf in Arizona
WGC-Accenture Match Play Championship
WGC-Accenture Match Play Championship
WGC-Accenture Match Play Championship
WGC-Accenture Match Play Championship